Paulina Ramanauskaitė (born 27 January 2003) is a Lithuanian ice dancer. With her skating partner, Deividas Kizala, she competed at the 2022 Winter Olympics.

Career

Early years 
As a singles skater, Ramanauskaitė won the Lithuanian national junior title in 2017–2018 and the senior title in 2019. She represented Lithuania at three ISU Championships — the 2018 World Junior Championships, 2019 World Junior Championships, and 2019 European Championships.

Partnership with Kizala 
In 2020, Ramanauskaitė teamed up with Deividas Kizala Paulina  to compete in senior ice dancing. The two made their international debut in December 2020, at the Winter Star in Minsk, Belarus.

Although Allison Reed / Saulius Ambrulevičius qualified a spot for Lithuania in ice dancing at the 2022 Winter Olympics, Reed's application for Lithuanian citizenship was unsuccessful. Following this decision, Ramanauskaitė/Kizala were nominated to fill the spot and placed 23rd at the Olympics.

Programs

With Kizala

Women's singles

Competitive highlights 
CS: Challenger Series; JGP: Junior Grand Prix

Ice dance with Kizala

Women's singles

References

External links 
 
 

Lithuanian female ice dancers
2003 births
Living people
Sportspeople from Kaunas
Lithuanian female single skaters
Olympic figure skaters of Lithuania
Figure skaters at the 2022 Winter Olympics
Competitors at the 2023 Winter World University Games